Patulia High School is a Higher Secondary, boys-only school in Kolkata, India. Originally established in 1960 as a 2 class Junior High School, the school teaches grades 5 to 12 under the West Bengal Board of Secondary Education and the West Bengal Council of Higher Secondary Education.

It is situated at SchoolPara, Patulia, North 24 Parganas district, West Bengal.

Campus
The white school building has rooms with high ceilings, tall doors and windows. A third floor was constructed on top of the original two story building that maintains the architectural style.  The school has two large playgrounds, though it is used casually by students of the school.

Students
As of March 2011, a total of around 700 students study in the school. Each of the classes from 5 to 10 are divided into two sections A and B, each of which contain around 60 students. Class 11 and 12 are divided into two 'streams' known as Arts and Commerce.

Faculty
As of March 2011 around 20 teachers were teaching in the school.

Extracurricular activities
A football tournament is held during the summer. Intra-section competitions as well as inter-section and inter-class ones ensure that almost every student gets a chance to play at the official tournament. During the winter, a cricket tournament of smaller scope is held.

The annual sports competition is held in two stages, a heat followed by the finals. The events include running and the one-legged Race. The students engage in sports (mostly football with some cricket and table tennis) during the recess (commonly called the tiffin period) which lasts for 20 minutes from Monday to Thursday and for an hour on Fridays. There is no recess on Saturday (it is a half-day), while on Sunday the school is closed.

The annual prize distribution ceremony sees plays enacted by the students as well as other cultural programs held at the Derozio Hall. During the year other smaller cultural programs take place in the school, mainly featuring Rabindra Sangeets.

Uniform
The uniform is a white shirt with blue shorts or trousers, white socks and black shoes. Physical education days require a white trouser and white cades instead and in winter blue sweaters are allowed. The school badge is pinned to the shirt.

See also
Education in India
List of schools in India
Education in West Bengal

References

External links
 http://wikimapia.org/568848/PATULIA-HIGH-SCHOOL
 

Boys' schools in India
High schools and secondary schools in Kolkata
Schools in North 24 Parganas district
Educational institutions established in 1960
1960 establishments in West Bengal